Piyusti or Piyušti was a king of Hattusa during the 17th century BC (short chronology). He is mentioned in the Anitta text as being defeated by Anitta on at least two occasions.

Anitta and Piyusti 
In the second encounter, Piyusti and his auxiliary troops were defeated at the town of Šalampa. Later, Anitta was able to storm the city of Hattusa at night after its defenders were weakened by famine. Anitta utterly destroyed and cursed the Hatti capital. The later Hittite kings had to completely rebuild the city.

See also

History of the Hittites

Sources 

Hattian kings
17th-century BC rulers